Cara Pifko (born March 15, 1976) is a Canadian actress known primarily for her work on television shows produced by the Canadian Broadcasting Corporation.

Life and career
Pifko was born in Toronto, Ontario. A graduate of the National Theatre School of Canada, she started acting at the age of 8 and worked all through the nineties, but it was in 2000 that she landed her first starring role, in the series Our Hero, which was aimed at young teens. Her first acting role was The Elephant Show hosted by Sharon, Lois, and Bram in which she was present in all seasons.

In 2004 she showed her dramatic range by appearing as a foreign aid worker in the acclaimed mini-series Human Cargo. Pifko then landed the lead role in the legal drama This is Wonderland, which garnered her a Gemini Award in 2005 for best actress. In early 2006, she appeared as Isolda in Tarragon Theatre's production of Léo. In 2007 she starred in the Lifetime TV movie I Me Wed. In 2009, she joined the soap opera General Hospital as the recurring character of Louise Addison. 

In 2010 Cara lent her voice to Suu, a pink Twi'lek in the "Deserter" episode, and as scientist Sionver Boll in "The Zillo Beast" and "The Zillo Beast Strikes Back" episodes of Star Wars: The Clone Wars.  She also voiced Yeoman Kelly Chambers in the video games Mass Effect 2 and Mass Effect 3.

In 2016 she joined the Season 2 cast of Better Call Saul as recurring character Paige Novick, senior legal counsel for Mesa Verde Bank and Trust, and friend of Kim Wexler.

Cara also voiced Suu Lawquane in Star Wars: The Bad Batch.

Personal life
She has been married to Gareth Bennett since 2004. She has two children.

Filmography

Film

Television

Video games

References

External links

1976 births
Living people
Actresses from Toronto
Canadian child actresses
Canadian film actresses
Canadian television actresses
Canadian voice actresses
Canadian people of French descent
Canadian people of Polish descent
Jewish Canadian actresses 
Best Actress in a Drama Series Canadian Screen Award winners
National Theatre School of Canada alumni
21st-century Canadian actresses